Pronophilina is a Neotropical subtribe of butterflies of the subfamily Satyrinae. They are a species-rich group with highest diversity in the tropical and subtropical mountains, especially the Andes. Before 1970, they were poorly studied, but recent interest has resulted in high rates of species description from previously unexplored mountain ranges. However, there is still a lack of knowledge on their biology and ecology. 
Their relationship to other groups of Satyrine butterflies and their complex patterns of speciation within and among mountain ranges have led to several biogeographic discussions.

Systematics and taxonomy

Traditionally the name Pronophilini (or Pronophilidi) was used to describe a tribe of Neotropical satyrines, but modern arrangement place them as a subtribe within the tribe Satyrini of the Satyrinae. The number of genera included in Pronophilina is disputed, since some genera were formally transferred to the subtribes Erebiina and Hypocystinas,

but some authors reject this arrangement.

Morphological analysis indicates there is a distinct core group of Pronophilina sensu stricto, and one or two additional groups (Neotropical Erebiina and Hypocystina in their original designation), but molecular analysis suggest they are each other's sister taxa and form a monophyletic group.

By the time Reuter proposed Pronophilidi as a formal tribe, there were some 230 described species. That number rose to 300 species by 1907, and 370 by 1970, primarily due to the work on museum and collection specimens by (in chronological order) William Chapman Hewitson, Cajetan Freiherr von Felder & Rudolf Felder, Arthur Gardiner Butler, Otto Staudinger, Theodor Otto Thieme and Gustav Weymer. More detailed field studies in the northern Andes by Adams and Bernard during the 1970s and 1980s resulted in many new taxa descriptions and a better understanding of their distribution and ecology and lead to an increased interest in this group after the 1990s. More than 100 species have been described since 1970, mostly due to contribution from A. L. Viloria, T. W. Pyrcz and G. Lamas, and it is estimated that the number of known taxa (including several yet unpublished species and subspecies descriptions) has nearly doubled in that period.

Description

The subtribe Pronophilina can be separated from other American satyrines by the following three external morphological synapomorphies: eyes always densely hairy; hindwing cross vein m1-m2 always curved or angled basally into the discal cell; maximum length of hindwing discal cell equal to or longer than half the total maximum length of the hindwing (excluding tails). These characters separate the Pronophilina sensu stricto from other Neotropical montane satyrids previously included in the group. This arrangement has been adopted by Lamas, but phylogenetic analysis based on molecular data suggests a larger, more inclusive delimitation of Pronophilina is needed.

The background color of most species is dominated by brown, dark gray or black, with few and slight distinctive features in the wings, but some species show colorful variations between white, yellow, orange, red and iridescent blue.

Genera

Pronophilina sensu stricto
 Altopedaliodes Forster, 1964
 Antopedaliodes Forster, 1964
 Apexacuta Pyrcz, 2004
 Arhuaco Adams & Bernard, 1977
 Calisto (Hübner, 1823)
 Cheimas Thieme, 1907
 Corades Doubleday, [1849]
 Corderopedaliodes Forster, 1964
 Daedalma Hewitson, 1858
 Dangond Adams & Bernard, 1979
 Dioriste Thieme, 1907
 Drucina Butler, 1872
 Eretris Thieme, 1905
 Eteona Doubleday, 1848
 Foetterleia Viloria, 2004
 Junea Hemming, 1964
 Lasiophila C. & R.Felder, 1859
 Lymanopoda Westwood, 1851
 Mygona Thieme, 1907
 Neopedaliodes Viloria, Miller & Miller, 2004
 Oxeoschistus Butler, 1867
 Panyapedaliodes Forster, 1964
 Paramo Adams & Bernard, 1977
 Parapedaliodes Forster, 1964
 Pedaliodes Butler, 1867
 Pherepedaliodes Forster, 1964
 Physcopedaliodes Forster, 1964
 Praepedaliodes Forster, 1964
 Praepronophila Forster, 1964
 Pronophila Doubleday, [1849]
 Protopedaliodes Viloria & Pyrcz, 1994
 Pseudomaniola Röber, 1889
 Punapedaliodes Forster, 1964
 Redonda Adams & Bernard, 1981
 Sierrasteroma Adams & Bernard, 1977
 Steremnia Thieme, 1905
 Steroma Westwood, [1850]
 Steromapedaliodes Forster, 1964
 Thiemeia Weymer, 1912

Disputed, Pronophilina or Hypocystina (=Coenonymphina)
 Argyrophorus Blanchard, 1852
 Auca Hayward, 1953
 Chillanella Herrera, 1966
 Cosmosatyrus C. & R.Felder, 1867
 Elina Blanchard, 1852
 Etcheverrius Herrera, 1965
 Faunula C. & R.Felder, 1867
 Haywardella Herrera, 1966
 Homoeonympha C. & R.Felder, 1867 (including Erebina and Stygnolepis)
 Nelia Hayward, 1953
 Neomaenas Wallengren, 1858 (sometimes including Spinantenna)
 Neosatyrus Wallengren, 1858
 Palmaris Herrera, 1965
 Pampasatyrus Hayward, 1953 (including Pseudocercyonis)
 Pamperis Heimlich, 1959
 Punargentus Heimlich, 1963
 Quilaphoetosus Herrera, 1966
 Spinantenna Hayward, 1953 (sometimes included in Neomaenas)
 Tetraphlebia C. & R.Felder, 1867

Disputed, Pronophilina or Erebiina
 Diaphanos Adams & Bernard, 1981
 Ianussiusa Pyrcz & Viloria 2004
 Idioneurula Strand, 1932 (including Tamania Pyrcz, 1995)
 Manerebia Staudinger, 1897
 Neomaniola Hayward, 1949
 Sabatoga Staudinger, 1897
 Stuardosatyrus Herrera & Etcheverry, 1965

Previously in Pronophilina but of uncertain position
 Amphidecta Butler, 1867
 Gyrocheilus Butler, 1867
 Catargynnis Röber, 1892
 Druphila Pyrcz, 2004
 Proboscis Thieme, 1907

Biology

The life cycle of pronophiline butterflies has been scarcely documented. Schultze described incomplete life histories for Pedaliodes phoenissa (Hewitson), Lymanopoda samius Westwood and Junea doraete (Hewitson). Other authors have observed oviposition on Chusquea (Poaceae) or other woody bamboos, or loosely over grass dominated vegetation. Early stages of several species found in Costa Rica were published by DeVries. Recently, life cycle description have been documented for Parapedaliodes parepa (Hewitson) in Ecuador, Pedaliodes zingara Viloria & Heredia in Colombia, Pedaliodes poesia (Hewitson) and Corades medeba Doubleday in Ecuador, and Daedalma dinias emma Pyrcz & Greeney and Daedalma rubroreducta Pyrcz & Willmott.

Biotic associations

Host plants

All reported host plants are in the family Poaceae, with the genus Chusquea featuring prominently, and a few records in Cynodon, Saccharum, Bambusa, Guada, Rhipidocladum, Merostachys and Zea, among others.

Parasitism
Parasitoids in the early stages of pronophiline butterflies have not been properly documented, although they might be locally important. Incidence of ectoparasitic Diptera (probably Ceratopogonidae) have been documented for seven species of the genera Corades, Lasiophila, Lymanopoda, Mygona and Pedaliodes.

Mimicry
There are 18 documented examples of convergent coloration patterns between coexisting pairs of pronophiline species from different genera (three examples), between pronophiline species and other satyrines (eight examples), and between pronophiline species and other butterflies or skippers (seven examples). Most examples involve species of Lymanopoda or Eretris. Some of these observations have been described as mimetic relationships, but the degree of resemblance is not so accurate as in other mimetic butterfly groups, there is no direct evidence of unpalatability of pronophiline butterflies, and no clear understanding of the ecological consequences of such resemblance.

Diversity

Depending on the classification adopted, the pronophilini include between 592 and 711 species. This represents approximately 50–60% of the Neotropical, and 23–27% of the worldwide Satyrinae.

Most species have a geographically and altitudinally restricted distribution in the tropical and subtropical Andes, and other mountain ranges in Brazil, the Guayana Shield, Central America, and Mexico. The genus Calisto has a Caribbean distribution, and some other genera are distributed in Patagonia.

Biogeography

The pronophilines have been involved in diverse biogeographical discussions that aim to explain their current distribution, diversity and endemism. The high diversity within the Pronophilina, and the distinctive speciation patterns in mountain and Caribbean taxa, has also motivated discussion about parapatric and sympatric speciation.

Origins

The affinities of the Pronophilina to other species groups within the specious Satyrinae suggest different interpretations about its origin. Viloria reviewed morphological characters and separated three groups that might have different phylogenetic and biogeographic affinities: a major group of 39 true Neotropical Pronophilina, including the genus Calisto with a Caribbean distribution, eight genera related to the Holarctic Erebiina, and 19 genera which he placed as Neotropical representatives of the otherwise Australasian Hypocystina. This grouping would suggest an amphi-Pacific distribution of the Hypocystina, and imply a Gondwanan origin according to a panbiogegraphic interpretations. This hypothesis was rebutted after a large phylogenetic analysis of the Satyrinae recovered a representative sample of pronophiline genera as a monophyletic group, and suggested a completely Neotropical, or at least, a common origin for the group. However, the relationships of the group remain unresolved, as subsequent work has found that at least two genera – Eretris, and the Caribbean Calisto—might be closer related to Holarctic Satyrines, but larger taxonomic sampling and a better integration of molecular and morphological data is needed to rule out analytical artifacts.

Speciation

It has been observed that most mountain species, especially in the species-rich genera close to Pedaliodes, have very narrow altitudinal ranges, and are restricted to one or few mountain ranges. This leads to high turn-over of species along altitudinal gradients within a mountain range, and high turn-over between ranges. Most species appear to be more closely related to those occupying a similar altitudinal range in neighboring mountains, than to the species below or above. A possible mechanism was proposed by Adams and extensively discussed by Viloria. This involves a series of alternative events of colonization and isolation that would be linked to repeated cycles of cold-wet and warm-dry climate (glaciations and interglaciation periods).

The genus Calisto also shows a distinctive radiation in the Caribbean, where it is the only representative of the Satyrinae. At least 54 named taxa have been recognized, most of them restricted to particular habitats in the island of Hispaniola, with fewer species in Cuba, Jamaica and Puerto Rico. The diversification of Calisto is referred to as an example of adaptive radiation into contrasting habitat types.

References

Satyrini
Nymphalidae of South America
Lepidoptera subtribes